Events in the year 1916 in Brazil.

Incumbents

Federal government 
 President: Venceslau Brás 
 Vice President: Urbano Santos da Costa Araújo

Governors 
 Alagoas: João Batista Accioli Jr.
 Amazonas: Jônatas de Freitas Pedrosa
 Bahia: José Joaquim Seabra, then Antônio Ferrão Muniz de Aragão
 Ceará: 
 till 12 July: Benjamin Liberato Barroso
 from 12 July: João Tomé de Sabóia e Silva
 Goiás:
 till 6 May: Joaquim Rufino Ramos Jubé
 6 May - October 13: Salatiel Simões de Lima
 from October 13: Aprígio José de Sousa
 Maranhão: Herculano Nina Parga
 Mato Grosso: Caetano Manuel de Faria e Albuquerque
 Minas Gerais: Delfim Moreira
 Pará: Enéas Martins
 Paraíba: 
 till 1 July: Antônio da Silva Pessoa
 1 July - 22 October: Sólon Barbosa de Lucena
 from 22 October: Francisco Camilo de Holanda
 Paraná: 
 Carlos Cavalcanti de Albuquerque
 Afonso Camargo
 Pernambuco: Manuel Antônio Pereira Borba
 Piauí:
 till 1 July: Miguel de Paiva Rosa
 from 1 July: Eurípedes Clementino de Aguiar
 Rio Grande do Norte: Joaquim Ferreira Chaves
 Rio Grande do Sul: Antônio Augusto Borges de Medeiros
 Santa Catarina:
 São Paulo: Francisco de Paula Rodrigues Alves (until 1 May); Altino Arantes Marques (from 1 May)
 Sergipe:

Vice governors 
 Rio Grande do Norte:
 São Paulo:

Events 
5 March - The liner Príncipe de Asturias runs aground in fog on the shoals out of Ponta do Boi, in the island of Sao Sebastião, while trying to approach the port of Santos.  At least 445 people out of the 588 aboard are killed.
3 May -  Brazilian merchant ship Rio Branco is sunk by a German submarine.  Because the ship is in restricted waters and registered under the British flag, and most of its crew is Norwegian, it is not considered an illegal attack by the Brazilian government, despite public protests.
August 
Brazilian Naval Aviation is established, in preparation for the country's participation in the First World War.
The capture of rebel leader Deodato Manuel Ramos ("Adeodato") marks the effective end of the Contestado War.

Births 
30 April - Armando Círio, Archbishop of Cascavel 1979-1995 (died 2014)
14 July - André Franco Montoro, lawyer and politician (died 1999)
22 July - Gino Bianco, Italian-born racing driver (died 1984)
19 December - Manoel de Barros, poet (died 2014)

Deaths 
24 August - João Zeferino da Costa, artist (born 1840)

References

See also 
1916 in Brazilian football

 
1910s in Brazil
Years of the 20th century in Brazil
Brazil
Brazil